In classical music from Western culture, an augmented third is an interval of five semitones. It may be produced by widening a major third by a chromatic semitone. For instance, the interval from C to E is a major third, four semitones wide, and both the intervals from C to E, and from C to E are augmented thirds, spanning five semitones. Being augmented, it is considered a dissonant interval.

Its inversion is the diminished sixth, and its enharmonic equivalent is the perfect fourth.

The just augmented third, E, is 456.99 cents or 125:96.  The Pythagorean augmented third, E, is 521.51 cents or 177147:131072, eleven just perfect fifths.

References

Augmented intervals
Thirds (music)